The Poor Rich Man is a surviving 1918 American silent costume-romance film, produced and distributed by Metro Pictures. It was directed by Charles Brabin and starred screen lovers Francis X. Bushman and Beverly Bayne.

Cast
Francis X. Bushman as Vantyne Carter
Beverly Bayne as Arizona Brown
Stuart Holmes as Teddy Carter
Sally Crute as Edith Trentoni
William Frederic as Pecos Bill Brown
C.J. Williams as James Carter
Jules Cowles as Hobo
Louis Wolheim as Wrestler

See also
Francis X. Bushman filmography

Preservation status
This film is preserved at the BFI National Film and Television Archive in London, courtesy of MGM.

References

External links

1918 films
Metro Pictures films
American silent feature films
Films directed by Charles Brabin
1910s romance films
American black-and-white films
American romance films
Silent romance films
1910s American films
1910s English-language films